Heth may refer to:

 Heth (letter), a letter in many Semitic alphabets
 Heth (surname)

People
 Children of Heth, a Canaanite nation in the Hebrew Bible, named after Heth, son of Canaan, son of Ham, son of Noah
 In the Book of Mormon: 
 Heth (Early Jaredite), an early Jaredite, son of Com.
 Heth (Middle Jaredite), a later Jaredite, son of Hearthom.
 Land of Heth, a place in the Book of Mormon.
 "Heth", the signature of Australian cartoonist and caricaturist  Norman Hetherington (1921–2010)

See also 
 Het (disambiguation)
 Hett (disambiguation)
 Hat (disambiguation)